Bourdon derives from the French for bumblebee, and may refer to:

 Bourdon (bell), the lowest bell in a set
 Bourdon (organ pipe), a stopped organ pipe of a construction favored for low pitches
 Bourdon (surname)
 Drone (music): The lowest course of a lute, or the lowest drone pipe of a bagpipe, sometimes called a bourdon
 Faux bourdon, fauxbourdon, faburden or falsobordone, terms applied (without perfect consistency) to a variety of music compositional techniques
 Bourdon, Somme, a small town in France
 Bourdon (grape), another name for the French wine grape Douce noir

See also
 Bourdon gauge or Bourdon tube, named after Eugène Bourdon
Boudon
Boudon noir, an alternative name for the Italian wine grape Dolcetto
Boudin (disambiguation)
Burden (disambiguation)